The 2007–08 Israeli Premier League season began on 18 August 2007 and ended on 1 June 2008, with Beitar Jerusalem win their second consecutive title.

Two teams from Liga Leumit were promoted at the end of the previous season: Ironi Kiryat Shmona and Bnei Sakhnin. The two teams relegated were Hakoah Amidar Ramat Gan and Hapoel Petah Tikva.

Teams and Locations

Twelve teams took part in the 2007-08 Israeli Premier League season, including ten teams from the 2006-07 season, as well as two teams which were promoted from the 2006-07 Liga Leumit.

Ironi Kiryat Shmona were promoted as champions of the 2006-07 Liga Leumit. Bnei Sakhnin were promoted as runners up. Bnei Sakhnin returned after an absence of one season, while Ironi Kiryat Shmona made their debut in the top flight.

Hakoah Amidar Ramat Gan and Hapoel Petah Tikva were relegated after finishing in the bottom two places in the 2006-07 season.

League table

Results
The schedule consisted of three rounds. During first two rounds, each team played each other once home and away for a total of 22 matches. The pairings of the third round were then set according to the standings after first two rounds, giving every team a third game against each opponent for a total of 33 games per team.

First and second round

Third round

Goals

Top Goalscorers

Source: The Israel Football Association

IFPA Leading Players of Season 2007–08

Best Player of the Year 

  Gal Alberman - Beitar Jerusalem

Best Foreign Player of the Year 

  Derek Boateng - Beitar Jerusalem

Best Manager of the Year 

  Itzhak Shum - Beitar Jerusalem

Discovery of the Year 

  Maor Buzaglo - Bnei Sakhnin

Best Goalkeeper of the Year 

  Liran Strauber - Maccabi Netanya

Best Defender of the Year 

  Arik Benado - Beitar Jerusalem

See also
List of Israeli football transfers 2007-08
2007–08 Toto Cup Al

 

Israeli Premier League seasons
Israel
1